Ane Bergara Artieda (born 3 February 1987) is a Spanish retired footballer who played as a defender. She was a member of the Spain women's national team.

Career
Bergara played her entire career in Primera División. She spent four seasons with SD Lagunak, six with RCD Espanyol, four with Real Sociedad, two with FC Barcelona and a single-year swansong at Athletic Bilbao.

International career
Bergara was a member of the Spain under-19 team that won the 2004 U-19 European Championship.

Honours

Club
Espanyol 
 Primera División: 2005–06
 Copa de la Reina: 2006, 2009, 2010

International
Spain U19 
 UEFA Women's Under-19 Championship : 2004

References

External links
Ane Bergara at Txapeldunak 

1987 births
Living people
People from Cinco Villas, Navarre
Footballers from Navarre
Spanish women's footballers
Women's association football defenders
SD Lagunak (women) players
RCD Espanyol Femenino players
Real Sociedad (women) players
FC Barcelona Femení players
Athletic Club Femenino players
Primera División (women) players
Spain women's youth international footballers
Spain women's international footballers
21st-century Spanish women